Narek Abgaryan (born 6 January 1992) is an Armenian boxer. He competed in the men's flyweight event at the 2016 Summer Olympics.

References

External links
 

1992 births
Living people
Armenian male boxers
Olympic boxers of Armenia
Boxers at the 2016 Summer Olympics
European Games competitors for Armenia
Boxers at the 2015 European Games
Flyweight boxers